Völs is a market town in the district of Innsbruck-Land in the Austrian state of Tyrol, located at the western border of Innsbruck. It was mentioned for the first time in documents in 1188. 

It serves as a shopping center and storage area for the city of Innsbruck.

Population

References

External links

Cities and towns in Innsbruck-Land District